Slobodan Urošević (Serbian Cyrillic: Слободан Урошевић; born 15 April 1994) is a Serbian professional footballer who plays as a left-back for Partizan.

Club career
After coming through the youth system of Rad, Urošević made his senior debuts on loan at BASK in late 2012. He returned to his parent club in early 2013, recording two appearances until the end of the season. He made his debut for Rad on May 2, 2013, in the league game that his club lost 1–0 against Vojvodina in Novi Sad. He played one more league match until the end of that season, and in the following 2013/14. He played in 17 league matches.

In the summer of 2014, Urošević signed with Napredak Kruševac. He was a standard first team member of Napredek during the 2014/15 season. He moved on a season-long loan to Belgian side OH Leuven in July 2015, with an option for a permanent deal. In the summer of 2016, he returned to Napredak, and in October of the same year, he extended his contract with the club from Kruševac. In the 2016/17 season. Urošević played 34 league matches for Napredak, and during the first half of the 2017/18 season. He made 14 more appearances in this competition.

On 11 January 2018, Urošević was transferred to Partizan on a four-year contract as the first choice of coach Miroslav Đukić. Urošević made his debut on 15 February, in UEFA Europa League Round of 32 as he played full 90 minutes in a 1–1 home draw against Viktoria Plzeň. He found himself in the starting eleven in the return leg a week later and once again played a whole game, as Partizan was defeated 2–0 on Doosan Arena in Plzeň. Urošević won Serbian Cup with Partizan as he made two appearances in the competition.

The following season Urošević played 23 league matches and won the Cup once again as he made five appearances in the competition. Urošević was in the Starting lineup for the final game that Partizan won 1–0 against fierce rival Red Star. In the UEFA Europa League 2019–20 Group L Urošević played full 90 minutes in all six games against Manchester United, AZ Alkmaar and Astana. He netted his first goal for the club on 1 December 2019 in a 2–0 away victory over Mačva, Partizan had the initiative, but there were no real opportunities until the 70th minute, when Urošević scored a goal, after the ball bounced to him after a free kick. Urošević failed to win his third Cup Trophy in a row as Partizan was defeated in the final by Vojvodina. 

Since coming to Partizan, the 2021-22 season was the best for Urošević, he played 47 games and scored 7 goals in three competitions.

International career
Urošević represented Serbia at the 2013 UEFA European Under-19 Championship. He made four appearances in the tournament, helping the team win the gold medal.

On 29 September 2016, Urošević appeared for Serbia as a substitute in a friendly against Qatar. The team, composed entirely of players from the country's domestic league, went on to lose the game 3–0.

Honours

Club
Partizan
 Serbian Cup: 2017–18, 2018–19

International
Serbia
 UEFA Under-19 Championship: 2013

Notes

References

External links
 
 
 
 
 

Association football defenders
Belgian Pro League players
Expatriate footballers in Belgium
FK BASK players
FK Napredak Kruševac players
FK Partizan players
FK Rad players
Oud-Heverlee Leuven players
Serbia international footballers
Serbia youth international footballers
Serbian expatriate footballers
Serbian expatriate sportspeople in Belgium
Serbian footballers
Serbian SuperLiga players
Footballers from Belgrade
1994 births
Living people